Sherilyn Marjorie Wolter (born November 30, 1951) is an American former actress.

Wolter starred on the TV series B. J. and the Bear in 1981, and then portrayed Celia Quartermaine on the daytime soap opera General Hospital from March 17, 1983, to February 26, 1986, and Elena Nikolas on Santa Barbara in 1987. She also briefly replaced Hunter Tylo as Taylor Hayes in The Bold and the Beautiful in 1990, and appeared as George on Guiding Light in 1993. Wolter played a blinded artist in the 1989 film Eyewitness to Murder, Mitch's girlfriend in the first season of Baywatch (1990), and Justine Strickland in the 1992 miniseries Judith Krantz's Secrets.

Wolter has also made numerous guest appearances on several television series. She graduated from Encina High School in 1969. She resides in Hawaii selling sarongs in a shop there and writing a class to teach acting for non-actors.

References

External links
 

American television actresses
American soap opera actresses
Living people
1951 births
Actors from Clarksburg, West Virginia
21st-century American women